José de Jesús Méndez Vargas (born 28 February 1974), commonly referred to by his alias El Chango ("The Ape"),  is a Mexican drug lord and former leader of the now disbanded La Familia drug cartel, headquartered in the state of Michoacán.

Méndez took control of the cartel after its former leader, Nazario Moreno, was allegedly killed in a shootout with Mexican Federal Police on December 9, 2010. His protection was the responsibility of twelve gunmen he called the "Twelve Apostles". His leadership, however, was disputed by Servando Gómez Martínez and Enrique Plancarte Solís who left the organization and formed the Knights Templar.

Kingpin Act sanction
On 25 February 2010, the United States Department of the Treasury sanctioned Méndez under the Foreign Narcotics Kingpin Designation Act (sometimes referred to simply as the "Kingpin Act"), for his involvement in drug trafficking along with twenty-one other international criminals and ten foreign entities. The act prohibited U.S. citizens and companies from doing any kind of business activity with him, and virtually froze all his assets in the U.S.

Arrest
Méndez was captured at a road checkpoint on June 21, 2011 by Mexican Federal police in the state of Aguascalientes. The Mexican government had offered a $30 million pesos (US$2.1 million) bounty for information leading to Méndez's capture. On 8 April 2014, a Mexican federal court rejected Méndez's writ of amparo (equivalent to an injunction) to prevent his extradition to the United States, where he is wanted in a New York federal court for drug trafficking offenses.

See also
War on Drugs
Mexican drug war
Mérida Initiative
 List of Mexico's 37 most-wanted drug lords

References

External links
Mexico captures top drug cartel leader — CNN on YouTube (Video)

Living people
La Familia Michoacana traffickers
Mexican crime bosses
People of the Mexican Drug War
Mexican drug traffickers
Mexican money launderers
Mexican prisoners and detainees
1974 births
People sanctioned under the Foreign Narcotics Kingpin Designation Act
People from Michoacán